Sasquatch (Walter Langkowski) is a fictional superhero appearing in American comic books published by Marvel Comics.

Publication history

Sasquatch first appeared in The Uncanny X-Men #120 and was created by John Byrne.

Fictional character biography
Dr. Walter Langkowski is a member of Alpha Flight, native of Vancouver, British Columbia, Canada, renowned physicist, and professor at McGill University. He is also a professional football player for the Green Bay Packers. In the 1993 miniseries The Infinity Crusade it is revealed that Sasquatch is Jewish.

He possesses the ability to change into an orange-furred beast known as Bigfoot. This metamorphosis is triggered by willpower. In this form, Langkowski has immense physical attributes and natural weaponry.

These powers were a result of Langkowski's self-experimentation with gamma radiation. In an attempt to become like the Hulk, Langkowski bombarded himself with a gamma ray projector at his laboratory near the Arctic Circle. As a proposed explanation for why he transforms into an orange behemoth instead of green (as gamma-irradiated persons are usually affected), Langkowski assumed it had something to do with the Aurora Borealis.

However, unknown to Langkowski, it was not the gamma rays that turned him into Sasquatch, but in fact that his lab equipment opened a doorway between their world and the "Realm of Great Beasts." When it  was opened, a mystical beast named Tanaraq invaded Langkowski's body and granted him his powers. Langkowski learns how to maintain his own personality and intelligence while in Sasquatch form, and this was very successful for a time.

Alpha Flight
As a member of the Canadian superhero team Alpha Flight, Sasquatch battled the X-Men in an attempt to capture Wolverine. He later battled the Hulk, and then, alongside the Hulk, battled the Wendigo. Alongside Alpha Flight again, he battled the Great Beast Tundra. With Alpha Flight, Namor, and the Invisible Woman, he first encountered the Master of the World. He then battled the Super-Skrull. With Alpha Flight, he battled Omega Flight. Alongside Rom and Alpha Flight, he battled the Dire Wraiths. With Alpha Flight, he went on a mission with the X-Men and clashed with Loki. Sasquatch was becoming increasingly prone to feral rages, making him reluctant to function in a fight. His Sasquatch form was eventually revealed as an incarnation of Tanaraq, who took control of Sasquatch, forcing Snowbird to slay Langkowski.

New body and identity
After his death, Langkowski's teammates traveled to the realm of the Great Beasts to recover his soul, that is being preserved in what is called a "Phistash-Hasrak", but a preservation spell cast by Alpha Flight's resident sorcerer Shaman failed to prevent Langkowski's body from crumbling to dust. Once there, they were attacked by the Great Beast Somon, who summoned the Great Beasts Tundra, Kariooq, and Tolomaq against them. Snowbird battled Somon, eventually forcing him to relinquish control of the other Great Beasts and causing them to battle one another. Forcing the now-weakened Somon to reveal to them the location of Walter Langkowski's spirit, Alpha Flight ventured to the Pit of Ultimate Sadness, located beneath the Great Glow-Globe of Phistash-Hasrak, where Somon explained that the souls of those who once inhabited the realm laid in torture. Within the Pit, Somon explained to Alpha Flight that, in order to enter the Pit's Well of Sorrows, they must sacrifice love, hate and power. Sending Aurora (representing love), Northstar (representing hate) and Talisman (representing power) into the Well, Alpha Flight soon realized the Well was a trap set by Somon. Snowbird quickly killed Somon and three trapped Alphans were reunited with the rest of the team. Shaman soon deduced from Somon's trap that no actual souls still remained within the Well of Sorrows but rather, the only wandering soul (Walter's) resided above the Well, within the Glow-Globe of Phistash-Hasrak. Containing Walter's soul within a globe of its own from his pouch, Shaman then transported Alpha Flight back to Earth, where they met with Heather Hudson and Box. In desperation, Shaman projected the soul into the robot exoskeleton of Box, who had arrived just as the Alphans returned to Earth. After some searching for an alternate form, Langkowski and Box's creator, Roger Bochs, eventually scanned a humanoid, nearly mindless body trapped in another dimension. However, when the pair projected Langkowski's soul towards this body across an interdimensional "fishing line", it turned out to be the Hulk, and Langkowski, unwilling to displace his colleague and friend Bruce Banner (despite Banner's pleas to the contrary), let his soul dissipate into the interdimensional void.

Sasquatch is subsequently brought back to life first by temporarily inhabiting the miniaturized body of Smart Alec, then by inhabiting the body of the then-deceased Snowbird. At first limited to transforming between Snowbird's (female) human form and a white-furred version of his Sasquatch form, he called himself "Wanda Langkowski", and fought to be recognized as legally alive. This body was later mystically altered to be identical of his original body by Snowbird's spirit. After this, his Sasquatch form returned to its original orange hue. With Alpha Flight, he first battled Llan the Sorcerer. With Alpha Flight, alongside the Avengers, and the People's Protectorate, he battled the Atlantean army, the Peace Corpse, and the Combine. Alongside Alpha Flight, he defended Her against the Consortium.

2000s
In 2005, Sasquatch assembles another incarnation of Alpha Flight in order to rescue the original team from an alien race known as the Plodex. Sales were poor and the series was canceled with issue #12.

Along with Major Mapleleaf, Puck (both Eugene Judd and Zuzha Yu), Vindicator, Shaman, and Guardian, Sasquatch fights The Collective. He is later revealed to be the only member of Alpha Flight to survive the attack. Following the events of the 2006 "Civil War" storyline, Langkowski is recruited by the Canadian government to form a new team called Omega Flight. He goes out of control possessed by the Great Beast, Tanaraq, but manages to recover. He also forgives Michael Pointer for the indirect role he played in the destruction of Alpha Flight and apologized for forcing him into the role of Guardian. Sasquatch has gone to Wakanda, along with Wolfsbane, Thornn, and Feral. The group offers their assistance to Wolverine against Sabretooth. Feral is killed by Sabretooth and in the meantime, the villain Romulus forms plans of his own involving the group.

During the 2010 "Chaos War" storyline, Sasquatch makes a deal with the Great Beasts, bringing them to Earth so they can kill Amatusu-Mikaboshi. He alongside Snowbird, Northstar, and Aurora are reunited with a resurrected Guardian, Vindicator, Shaman, and Marrina Smallwood.

During the 2011 "Fear Itself" storyline, Sasquatch was seen helping Alpha Flight fight Attuma (in the form of Nerkodd: Breaker of Oceans) while saving people from the flood caused by Nerkodd. Once Nerkodd is defeated and repelled, Alpha Flight returns to their headquarters, only to end up betrayed by Gary Cody and his newly elected Unity Party. When in the custody of the Unity Party, Sasquatch's gamma energy is drained enough for him to revert to his human form of Walter Langkowski. At Parliament Hill, Walter is informed by Agent Jeff Brown that the concussions he had when he played football will cause him to act less human when he changes back into Sasquatch. Jeff also tells Walter that he will soon achieve Unity. Walter is later freed by Shaman who knocks out Agent Jeff Brown.

As part of the 2015 All-New, All-Different Marvel branding, Sasquatch appears as part of the Alpha Flight space program.

Immortal Hulk
While taking time off from the Alpha Flight space program, Walter met a reporter named Jackie McGee and agreed to aid her in her search for Bruce Banner. After Walter was stabbed breaking up a fight between two men, he wound up in the hospital where he turned into Sasquatch at night. After killing some doctors that were treating him, Sasquatch encounters Hulk who found that he is possessed by Brian Banner's ghost. Hulk was able to free Sasquatch from Brian's possession by draining the gamma energy out of him enough to depower Walter. It was revealed that Brian Banner's possession of Sasquatch was caused by the One Below All.

General Reginald Fortean nearly charged Walter for the deaths he caused and changed his mind when he decided to have Captain Marvel call the Avengers to go after Hulk and have him save Walter. After Hulk escaped from General Fortean's custody, Walter formed a new version of Gamma Flight to go after Hulk by starting with Puck as its first member.

Walter and Gamma Flight arrived at the area where the gamma bomb first turned Bruce Banner into Hulk. As Hulk fought Gamma Flight, Absorbing Man absorbed the leftover gamma radiation that enabled the One-Below-All to plunge New Mexico into its Below-Place. After Hulk defeated the One-Below-All, Walter and Gamma Flight were returned to Earth where Absorbing Man joined the group.

With Titania as its latest member, Walter and Gamma Flight ran into Doc Samson who reveals to them Hulk's plans to wipe out the human civilization.

Arriving in Reno, Nevada, Walter and Gamma Flight found the Subject B husk that the U.S. Hulk Operations placed Rick Jones' body in. They take it to the Alpha Flight Low-Orbit Space Station for study. Wearing the Redeemer armor, General Fortean raided the Alpha Flight Low-Orbit Space Station to reclaim the Subject B husk. While taking out the Gamma Flight members, Fortean also shoots Walter to make him pay for the deaths his Sasquatch form caused before making off with the Subject B husk.

Due to his door in the Below-Place being meddled, Doc Samson was able to revive himself in the body of Walter Langkowski on the Alpha Flight Low Orbit Space Station causing the body to turn into a green-haired version of Sasquatch. While reuniting with Gamma Flight and Jackie McGee, Samson told them about Leader's meddling and called this form of his Doc Sasqautch. Leading Gamma Flight to confront Hulk's Joe Fixit persona, Doc Sasquatch prevented everyone from getting sucked out when Joe Fixit punched a hole in the space station.

Walter Langkowski was able to revive himself in Doc Samson's body and took on the alias of Walter Samson.

Walter Samson made his way to the Baxter Building where he helped the Fantastic Four in locating the Below-Place in order to make use of the Forever Gate so that they can retrieve Bruce Banner and Jackie McGee.

Powers and abilities
As Sasquatch, Langkowski possesses abnormal strength and stamina, as well as resistance to injury (in an early appearance, he fought the Hulk for "fun" in order to test the limits of his own physique). He is sufficiently strong enough to pull a naval destroyer ashore for repairs, hold a DC-10 cargo plane against the thrust of its engines, and then, hurl it over 1,000 feet backwards. Thanks to his thick fur coat, he can survive in arctic environments. Sasquatch is able to jump vast distances, but less efficient. His claws are so sharp that they could penetrate materials, such as stone, wood, flesh, or even some types of metals. Langkowski's vision was magnified, allowing him to see clearly in beast form. He also has self-healing capabilities. This was demonstrated when his arm, broken in the murderous attack of Super-Skrull against a cosmic ray monitoring station, healed in changing into Sasquatch to fight that multi-powered foe.

Early in his career, switching between forms at will caused Langkowski extreme physical discomfort. To alleviate the pain, he recites a slow mantra while focusing on his body and thereby, calms it down. However, after many months of practice, he could effect the transformations with relative ease, without need for a meditative yoga. As Walter Samson, he has all the powers of Doc Samson.

Langkowski is a professionally trained scientist with knowledge of both physics and biophysics. He has experience dealing with many forms of experimental radiation and their mutagenic properties on lifeforms under controlled settings. As a former football player, Langkowski has athletic strength and endurance, though he is no longer in the peak condition of his life. Sasquatch also has formal combat skills, although he relies more on brute force than his own techniques.

Other characters named Sasquatch
A race of Sasquatches were discovered to live in the forests of British Columbia. They are first seen in Alpha Flight vol. 2 #1. Once a year, the Sasquatches gather at the City of Sasquatches in secret, where they worship their forgotten gods and breed with one another. One of these Sasquatches, a barely intelligent monster, is mistaken by Langkowski's teammates to be a highly degenerated Langkowski, but it was an actual Bigfoot that had been captured by Department H. He is kept in control by the touch of the superpowered Murmur, though not always successfully. This Sasquatch dies in a conflict with Department H's corrupt leadership and the Zodiac.

Another Sasquatch appears in the 2005-2006 Nick Fury's Howling Commandos series as a member of that titular group. What, if any, connection this character has to Walter Langkowski or the Sasquatch from Alpha Flight volume 2, is not revealed. He is first seen helping the Abominable Snowman to track down Groot.

Other versions
Versions of Sasquatch that differ from the familiar one usually seen in mainstream Marvel continuity have been seen in various story lines. Some of these involve incarnations of the character that appear in the same storylines as the prime version of the character, while others are seen in story lines set in alternate timelines or dimensions.

Doppelganger
A doppelganger of Sasquatch was created by Magus in Infinity War #1 and appeared in Infinity War #1, 5, Fantastic Four #369-370 and Wonder Man vol. 2 #15.

Exiles
A white-haired entity who appears to be Walter Langowski joins the Exiles, an interdimensional team of heroes dedicated to fixing breaks in the timeline. It is soon revealed that she is a black woman named Heather Hudson, shocking the team who are familiar with versions of Walter.

Marvel Zombies
In the Marvel Zombies comics set in the universe of Earth-2149, the zombified Alpha Flight attack the X-Men and are eventually killed by Magneto. Sasquatch is seen in a panel of Marvel Zombies Dead Days attacking the X-Man Wolverine. He is killed alongside the rest of zombie Alpha Flight by Magneto in the next panel.

Old Man Logan
In the possible future timeline seen in the second Old Man Logan ongoing series, it is revealed that Sasquatch and his fellow Alpha Flight members were killed by unknown villain opponents when the supervillain uprising had occurred. Old Man Logan experiences this illusion while he and Puck are taking part in a rescue mission on a space station that was attacked by the Brood.

Ultimate Marvel
An Ultimate Marvel version of Sasquatch is referenced as being killed off-panel by a hunter during the Ultimate X-Men arc "Shock and Awe". Sasquatch makes an appearance in the first part of the Ultimate X-Men'''s "Absolute Power" arc as a member of Alpha Flight. This Sasquatch, more savage than the 616 version, appears to know Rogue and to have experienced her powers firsthand, though Rogue does not recognize the character. The character is later revealed to be Rahne Sinclair, under the influence of the power-enhancing drug Banshee that enabled her to assume a Bigfoot-like form. She is injured by Nightcrawler, who while trying to teleport her away accidentally removes part of her arm.

What If?
Sasquatch appears in some What If stories:

 In "What If? Logan Battled Weapon X", Walter Langkowski is shown working with James McDonald Hudson as a scientist in Department H. He is killed off-panel by the man who was captured and laced with adamantium instead of Logan. It was never stated whether or not this Langkowski had become Sasquatch at the time of his death.
 Langkowski appears as Sasquatch in "What If? Wolverine Was the Leader of Alpha Flight". He fights under Wolverine's lead in battles with Annihilus and the Hellfire Club.

In other media
Television

 Sasquatch appeared in the X-Men episode "Repo Man", voiced by Harvey Atkin. This version is a member of Alpha Flight.
 Sasquatch appeared in The Incredible Hulk episode "Man to Man, Beast to Beast" with Walter Langkowski voiced by Peter Strauss and Sasquatch voiced by Clancy Brown. Bruce Banner comes to Canada hoping to find his old friend Langkowski to cure himself of the Hulk, only to find that Langkowski has developed a bestial alter ego while using himself as a test subject to make a breakthrough in gamma radiation. After battling the Hulk, Sasquatch exiles himself to the wilderness when his actions endanger the Hulk's friend, a small boy named Taylor.

Video games
 An evil doppelganger of Sasquatch appears in Marvel Super Heroes: War of the Gems.
 Sasquatch appears as a playable character in Marvel Super Hero Squad Online''.

Toys
 Hasbro has released two action figures of Sasquatch in its Marvel Legends line. The first one in 2006 as part of its Wave 12, and the second one in 2018 as a BAF (Build-a-Figure) in the first Deadpool wave.

References

Canadian superheroes
Characters created by John Byrne (comics)
Comics characters introduced in 1979
Fictional Canadian Jews
Fictional characters from British Columbia
Fictional characters with slowed ageing
Fictional characters with superhuman durability or invulnerability
Fictional characters with superhuman senses
Fictional Jews in comics
Fictional physicists
Fictional players of American football
Fictional professors
Fictional sport wrestlers
Fictional therianthropes
Jewish superheroes
Marvel Comics characters who are shapeshifters 
Marvel Comics characters who can move at superhuman speeds
Marvel Comics characters with accelerated healing
Marvel Comics characters with superhuman strength
Marvel Comics male superheroes
Marvel Comics mutates
Marvel Comics scientists

External links
Sasquatch at Marvel.com

Canadian superheroes
Characters created by John Byrne (comics)
Comics characters introduced in 1979
Fictional Canadian Jews
Fictional characters from British Columbia
Fictional characters with slowed ageing
Fictional characters with superhuman durability or invulnerability
Fictional characters with superhuman senses
Fictional Jews in comics
Fictional physicists
Fictional players of American football
Fictional professors
Fictional sport wrestlers
Fictional therianthropes
Jewish superheroes
Marvel Comics characters who are shapeshifters 
Marvel Comics characters who can move at superhuman speeds
Marvel Comics characters with accelerated healing
Marvel Comics characters with superhuman strength
Marvel Comics male superheroes
Marvel Comics mutates
Marvel Comics scientists